The Admiralty (East) Public Transport Interchange is a major bus terminus located in Admiralty, Central and Western District, Hong Kong. Located above Admiralty Station of the MTR, the terminus hosts bus routes to most destinations in the Southern District west of Deep Water Bay, so the usage is relatively high.

The interchange has different names named by different bus companies. The official name from the Government is Admiralty (East) Public Transport Interchange; Citybus and New World First Bus named it as the Admiralty (East) Bus Terminus; while the name from Kowloon Motor Bus is Admiralty Railway Station (East) Bus Terminus.

Location of terminus
Admiralty (East) Public Transport Interchange is located at 95 Queensway, ground floor of the United Centre. A MTR entrance/exit is located next to the exit of the terminus.

Facilities 
Fixed Regulators' Room is installed next to the entrance of the terminus. An NWFB Customer Service Centre is located at this terminus, providing route information of Citybus and NWFB, souvenirs for sale and value-adding of Octopus cards.

Feeder transport 
MTR  and  Admiralty Station Exit D
Admiralty (Rodney Street) Bus Terminus is located opposite to the terminus exit on Rodney Street. Citybus Route 789 to Siu Sai Wan terminates there.

References
 Public Transport Atlas 4th edition, published by Universal Publications
 The Development of Hong Kong Island Bus Routes in the 20th Century by Stanley Yung, published by BSI Hobbies

External links
Terminus Information on Citybus/NWFB Website

Admiralty, Hong Kong